Sko or SKO may refer to:
 Kanuri language, Standard Kanuri Orthography
 S-K-O, originally Schuyler, Knobloch and Overstreet, an American country music group
 S-Ko, a character in the Guilty Gears fighting game series
 Skou languages or Sko languages, group of languages spoken on New Guinea
 Skou language or Sko language, a language of West Papua, Indonesia
 Osnabrück Canal in Germany
 Sadiq Abubakar III International Airport, Sokoto, Nigeria
 Seko Tengah language (ISO 639-3: sko), an Austronesian language spoken on Sulawesi, Indonesia
 Shopko, an American retailer
 Swiss Communist Organization